Wallace Moses (October 8, 1910 – October 10, 1990) was an American professional baseball right fielder, who played Major League Baseball for the Philadelphia Athletics (1935–41; 1949–51), Chicago White Sox (1942–46) and Boston Red Sox  (1946–48). He was born in Uvalda, Georgia and attended Vidalia High School. He is the only player in Major League Baseball history to accomplish a "walk off steal of home" more than once, which he did twice.

Baseball career 

Moses started his professional career with Galveston of the Texas League, where he batted .316 in 1934.  He debuted with the Philadelphia Athletics on Opening Day of the  season, singling off Earl Whitehill of the Washington Senators before President Franklin D. Roosevelt and Vice President John Nance Garner at Griffith Stadium. He batted over .300 in each of his seven years with the Athletics, including a career-best .345 in his sophomore year.

Prior to the  seasons, he missed the opportunity to play for a World Series team, when his trade to the Detroit Tigers for Benny McCoy was nullified by Baseball Commissioner Kenesaw Mountain Landis. The commissioner's ruling made McCoy and 87 Tiger minor leaguers free agents.

Through years of last place finishes with Philadelphia, Moses had little chance to display his speed on the basepaths.

He played in his only World Series in 1946 as a member of the Red Sox. Moses started three of the Series' seven games in right field, and batted .417 (5-for-12), tied a Series record with four hits in a game. 

His first seven years with the A's, 1935 through 1941, were the most productive in his career. Moses surpassed .300 in every season. He produced 61 home runs, 354 RBI, and hit .317 (1,135-for-3,580). After being traded away after the  season, he never hit .300 again and his productivity declined, recording 28 home runs, 325 RBI, and batting .266 (1,003-for-3,776) over the next ten seasons with the White Sox, Red Sox and a second term with the A's. The closest he came to the .300 plateau is when he hit .295 with the White Sox in 1945. 

In his 17-season career, Moses hit .291 with 89 home runs and 679 RBI in 2,012 games played. He added 1,124 runs, 2,138 hits, 435 doubles, 110 triples and 174 stolen bases. His career fielding percentage was .973. A patient hitter with a good eye, Moses collected a 1.80 walk-to-strikeout ratio (821-to-457). He also made the American League All-Star team in 1937 and 1945.

Post career 
Immediately following his playing career, Moses became a coach for the Athletics from 1952–54, the A's final three seasons in Philadelphia. He then moved to the Philadelphia Phillies (1955–58), Cincinnati Reds (1959–60), New York Yankees (1961–62; 1966) and Detroit Tigers (1967–70), serving as both a first base coach and hitting instructor. He also was a minor league batting coach and scout for the Yankees. As a hitting coach, he would teach his batters to go after pitches and lean over the plate.

Moses died in Vidalia, Georgia two days after his 80th birthday.

Sixty-five years later, Miguel Tejada collected 204 (October 5).

See also
 List of Major League Baseball career hits leaders
 List of MLB all-time leaders in doubles
 List of Major League Baseball career doubles leaders
 List of athletes on Wheaties boxes
 List of Major League Baseball career triples leaders
 List of Major League Baseball career runs scored leaders
 List of Major League Baseball annual doubles leaders
 List of Major League Baseball annual triples leaders
 List of Major League Baseball career stolen bases leaders

References

External links

Wally Moses at SABR (Baseball BioProject)

1910 births
1990 deaths
American League All-Stars
American people of Scotch-Irish descent
Baseball coaches from Georgia (U.S. state)
Baseball players from Georgia (U.S. state)
Boston Red Sox players
Chicago White Sox players
Cincinnati Reds coaches
Detroit Tigers coaches
Elmira Colonels players
Galveston Buccaneers players
Major League Baseball first base coaches
Major League Baseball hitting coaches
Major League Baseball right fielders
Monroe Twins players
New York Yankees coaches
New York Yankees scouts
People from Montgomery County, Georgia
Philadelphia Athletics coaches
Philadelphia Athletics players
Philadelphia Phillies coaches
Shreveport Sports players